Edward John Herrmann (November 6, 1913 – December 22, 1999) was an American prelate of the Roman Catholic Church. He served as bishop of the Diocese of Columbus in Ohio from 1973 to 1982.  He previously served as an auxiliary bishop of the Archdiocese of Washington D.C. from 1966 to 1973.

Biography

Early life 
Herrmann was born in Baltimore, Maryland, on November 6, 1913, the son of Episcopalian parents, Walter E. and Jennie Doyle Herrmann, who owned a small grocery store. Walter Herrmann died in the 1918 flu pandemic.  Edward Herrmann was baptized a Catholic in 1919.

Herrmann attended St. Bernard and St. James grade schools, then graduated from Loyola High School in Baltimore in 1931.  He then went to work for the American Oil Company in Baltimore  during the Great Depression.  After deciding to enter the priesthood, Herrmann studied at Mount Saint Mary’s Seminary in Emmitsburg, Maryland.

Priesthood 
Herrmann was ordained a priest for the Archdiocese of Baltimore-Washington on June 12, 1947, in Baltimore’s Cathedral of the Assumption by Auxiliary Bishop John McNamara. He served as pastor and assistant chancellor.

Auxiliary Bishop of Washington 
Pope Paul VI appointed Herrmann as an auxiliary bishop of the Archdiocese of Washington and titular bishop of Lamzella on March 4, 1966.  He was consecrated by Archbishop Patrick O'Boyle on April 26, 1966 at St. Matthew’s Cathedral in Washington. He became vicar general and chancellor of the archdiocese.

Bishop of Columbus 
Herrmann was appointed bishop of the Diocese of Columbus on June 26, 1973 by Pope Paul VI;  Hermann was installed as its ninth bishop on August 21, 1973. 

Herrmann helped establish Operation Feed in Columbus, a countywide food drive that now provides millions of meals every year to people in the Columbus area.  He also reorganized the diocese into the 15 vicariates and instituted the  Emmaus Spirituality Program  for priests.

Retirement and legacy 
Pope John Paul II accepted Herrmann's resignation as bishop of the Diocese of Columbus on September 18, 1982.  He served as  diocesan administrator until April 25, 1983, when Bishop James A. Griffin succeeded him.  In retirement, Herrmann resided at St. Ann's Infant and Maternity Home in Avondale, Maryland.  However, he returned to Columbus in November 1991 to assist the bishop in the diocese. 

Edward Herrmann died on December 22, 1999, in Columbus and was buried in the crypt of St. Joseph Cathedral there.

References

External links 
Diocese of Columbus
Catholic-Hierarchy.org

1913 births
1999 deaths
Converts to Roman Catholicism from Anglicanism
Mount St. Mary's University alumni
Religious leaders from Baltimore
Roman Catholic Archdiocese of Washington
Roman Catholic bishops of Columbus
20th-century Roman Catholic bishops in the United States
Religious leaders from Washington, D.C.